Hypoprepia miniata, the scarlet-winged lichen moth or scarlet lichen moth, is a moth of the family Erebidae. The species was first described by William Kirby in 1837. It is found from British Columbia south through the western side of the Rocky Mountains to Arizona and Texas. It is also found throughout eastern North America.

The length of the forewings is 14–17 mm. The ground color of the forewings is red with two broad dark gray stripes and another shorter stripe between them at the outer margin. The hindwings are red, usually with a broad dark terminal band. Adults are on wing from July to August in the west and from April to September in the east.

The larvae feed on lichen growing on trees, preferably pines. The species overwinters in the larval stage.

Subspecies
Hypoprepia miniata miniata 
Hypoprepia miniata mississippiensis Barnes & Benjamin, 1926

References

Moths described in 1837
Cisthenina
Moths of North America